Avoros is a village in the Phocis prefecture of Central Greece.  At the 2011 census, it had 39 inhabitants.

Natural environment 
The village is known for its natural environment and it is built in a dense oak forest. It overlooks the lake of Mornos, a water reservoir that supplies water to Athens, Greece's capital city. The view from the village includes Mount Giona which is Greece's 5th tallest and other mountain ranges.

Immigration 
World War II and the Civil War that ensued (1945-1949) created the conditions that led to dramatic demographic changes that occurred in the village in the middle of the 20th century. Many families moved to Athens, Erateini and in urban centers in the United States of America.

Populated places in Phocis

External links
Avoros